Protected areas in Tanzania are extremely varied, ranging from sea habitats over grasslands to the top of the Kilimanjaro, the tallest mountain in Africa. About a third of the country's total area is protected to a certain degree as a national park, game reserve, marine park, forest reserve or the like.

The following list gives an overview on the various protected areas in Tanzania including their predominant habitat, wildlife and flora. Especially remarkable species (endemics or those occurring in unusually large numbers) are set in bold.

National parks
They are administered by the Tanzania National Parks Authority (TANAPA). Names like Arusha and Serengeti are well known, partly due to films about African wildlife.

Game Reserves and other protected areas

Marine Parks and Reserves

Nature Forest Reserves
Nature Forest Reserves (NFRs) are a designation under the National Forest Act of Tanzania which offers the highest level of protection. NFRs are state-owned and are managed by the Tanzania Forest Services (TFS) Agency. No extraction of timber or animals is permitted in forest nature reserves, and activities are generally restricted to research, education, and nature-based tourism.

 Amani Nature Forest Reserve
 Chome Nature Forest Reserve
 Kilombero Nature Forest Reserve
 Kipo Forest Reserve
 Magamba Nature Forest Reserve
 Minziro Nature Forest Reserve
 Mkingu Nature Forest Reserve
 Mount Hanang Nature Forest Reserve
 Mount Rungwe Nature Forest Reserve
 Nilo Nature Forest Reserve
 Rondo Nature Forest Reserve
 Uluguru Nature Forest Reserve
 Uzungwa Scarp Nature Forest Reserve

Game Controlled Areas
Endulen Game Controlled Area
Handeni Game Controlled Area
Kalimawe Game Controlled Area
Masailand Game Controlled Area
Kitwai Game Controlled Area

See also
 List of national parks
 Maziwi Island
 Ministry of Natural Resources and Tourism (Tanzania)

Notes

References

UNEP WCMC
Tanzania National Parks
Marine Parks in Tanzania

 

Tanzania
Tanzania
National parks
Protected areas